Club Life, Vol. 1 - Las Vegas is a mix compilation album by internationally acclaimed  DJ/Producer Tiësto, released in 2011 and promoted globally with a live set show tour under the same name. It is the first installment of his new compilation series called Club Life.

The album's name was given to honor the live set held by Tiësto at the Hard Rock Cafe & Casino, The Joint in Las Vegas, Nevada where he signed DJ Residency. The track list was chosen based on his favorite tracks played throughout the year, solidifying after his preview album Kaleidoscope, the DJ's newest venture into a more wide variety of house music elements; as opposed to his traditional focus in playing trance music almost exclusively.

Track listing

Charts

Weekly charts

Year-end charts

References

2011 compilation albums
Tiësto compilation albums